HMPO-DAPy is an experimental antiviral drug.

References

External links
 Recent highlights in the development of new antiviral drugs

Antiviral drugs
Pyrimidines